Birgit Sergelius (March 13, 1907 – January 29, 1979) was a Finnish-born stage and film actress who later settled and worked in Sweden. She was married to the actor Georg Rydeberg and to artist Erik Öhlin.

Selected filmography
 Charlotte Löwensköld (1930)
 Två hjärtan och en skuta (1932)
 Pettersson & Bendel (1933)
 Love and Dynamite (1933)
 Lyckan kommer (1942)
 Mister Collins' Adventure (1943)

References

Bibliography
 McIlroy, Brian. World Cinema: Sweden. Flicks Books, 1986.

External links

1907 births
1979 deaths
Swedish film actresses
Swedish stage actresses
20th-century Swedish actresses
Finnish film actresses
Finnish stage actresses
20th-century Finnish actresses
People from Helsinki
Finnish emigrants to Sweden